The Sieling senate was the state government of Bremen between 2015 and 2019, sworn in on 15 July 2015 after Carsten Sieling was elected as Mayor by the members of the Bürgerschaft of Bremen. It was the 24th Senate of Bremen.

It was formed after the 2015 Bremen state election by the Social Democratic Party (SPD) and Alliance 90/The Greens (GRÜNE). Excluding the Mayor, the senate comprised eight ministers, called Senators. Five were members of the SPD and three were members of the Greens.

The Sieling senate was succeeded by the Bovenschulte senate on 15 August 2019.

Formation 

The previous Senate was a coalition government of the SPD and Greens led by Mayor Jens Böhrnsen of the SPD.

The election took place on 10 May 2015, and resulted in substantial losses for both governing parties. The opposition CDU recorded a small improvement, and The Left made modest gains. The FDP re-entered the Bürgerschaft with 7%, while the AfD debuted at 6%. BiW retained their single seat in Bremerhaven.

Overall, the incumbent coalition retained its majority. The day after the election, however, Mayor Böhrnsen announced that he would step down as Mayor, taking responsibility for the SPD's unexpectedly severe losses. Former state parliamentary leader Carsten Sieling, who was a member of the Bundestag at the time of the election, was nominated as his successor on 18 May. He was approved by the SPD congress on 2 June.

Exploratory talks between the SPD and Greens to renew their governing coalition began on 27 May. Formal negotiations began the next week and concluded on 27 June. The congresses of both parties approved the coalition agreement on 11 June, with the SPD voting around 90% in favour and the Greens 85%.

Carsten Sieling was elected Mayor by the Bürgerschaft on 15 July, winning 46 votes out of 82 cast.

Composition 
The composition of the cabinet at the time of its dissolution was as follows:

References

External links

Government of Bremen (state)
State governments of Germany
Cabinets established in 2015
2015 establishments in Germany